Sangirese, also known as Sangihé, Sangi, and Sangih, is an Austronesian language spoken on the islands linking northern Sulawesi, Indonesia, with Mindanao, Philippines by the Sangirese people.

It belongs to the Philippine group within the Austronesian language family. Some lexical influence comes from Ternate and Spanish.

Phonology

Consonants 

 is mainly heard in the Sangihé dialect.

Vowels 

 Vowels  may also be heard as  within syllables.

References

Further reading 
  Accessed 10 Feb. 2023.

External links
 Sangirese song sample in Youtube
 The Lord's Prayer in Sangirese

Languages of Sulawesi
Languages of the Philippines
North Sulawesi
Sangiric languages